Minnetrista is a city in Hennepin County, Minnesota, United States. Largely rural, Minnetrista has agricultural activity involving corn, soybeans, hay and horses. In addition to farmland and woods, the city is home to several lakes, including part of Lake Minnetonka, the state's ninth-biggest.

Minnetrista's name originates in the Dakota language, in which minne means "water" and trista means "crooked." The population was 6,384 at the 2010 census. Minnetrista is often described as on the boundary between the suburban Twin Cities and rural Greater Minnesota.

Geography
The city is entirely in Hennepin County. County Roads 15, 44, 92, and 110 are its main routes.

Lakes in Minnetrista include Whaletail Lake, Little Long Lake, Mud Lake, Ox Yoke Lake, and Saunders Lake, as well as several bays of Lake Minnetonka.

Demographics

2010 census
As of the census of 2010, there were 6,384 people, 2,176 households, and 1,823 families living in the city. The racial makeup of the city was 96.3% White, 0.7% African American, 0.1% Native American, 1.6% Asian, 0.3% from other races, and 1.1% from two or more races. Hispanic or Latino of any race were 1.8% of the population.

There were 2,176 households, of which 45.5% had children under the age of 18 living with them, 76.7% were married couples living together, 4.2% had a female householder with no husband present, 2.9% had a male householder with no wife present, and 16.2% were non-families. 12.2% of all households were made up of individuals, and 3.9% had someone living alone who was 65 years of age or older. The average household size was 2.93 and the average family size was 3.21.

The median age in the city was 39.7 years. 31.2% of residents were under the age of 18; 4.2% were between the ages of 18 and 24; 25.1% were from 25 to 44; 31% were from 45 to 64; and 8.7% were 65 years of age or older. The gender makeup of the city was 50.7% male and 49.3% female.

2000 census
As of the census of 2000, there were 4,358 people, 1,505 households, and 1,249 families living in the city. The racial makeup of the city was 97.06% White, 0.34% African American, 0.21% Native American, 1.47% Asian, 0.50% from other races, and 0.41% from two or more races. Hispanic or Latino of any race were 0.67% of the population. 32.0% were of German, 16.1% Norwegian, 9.9% Swedish, 7.4% Irish and 6.0% English ancestry according to Census 2000.

There were 1,505 households, out of which 40.7% had children under the age of 18 living with them, 76.3% were married couples living together, 4.4% had a female householder with no husband present, and 17.0% were non-families. 13.2% of all households were made up of individuals, and 2.5% had someone living alone who was 65 years of age or older.  The average household size was 2.90 and the average family size was 3.20.

In the city, the population was spread out, with 29.3% under the age of 18, 5.3% from 18 to 24, 27.8% from 25 to 44, 30.3% from 45 to 64, and 7.4% who were 65 years of age or older.  The median age was 39 years. For every 100 females, there were 105.5 males.  For every 100 females age 18 and over, there were 102.6 males.

The median income for a household in the city was $90,347, and the median income for a family was $93,104. Males had a median income of $65,395 versus $41,645 for females. The per capita income for the city was $40,217.  About 2.1% of families and 2.8% of the population were below the poverty line, including 0.9% of those under age 18 and 5.8% of those age 65 or over.

Politics

Education
Waconia Public Schools and Westonka Public Schools operate area public schools, including Waconia High School and Mound Westonka High School.

References

External links
City of Minnetrista

Cities in Minnesota
Cities in Hennepin County, Minnesota
Dakota toponyms